The 2022 General Tire 200 is an upcoming ARCA Menards Series West race that will be held on June 11, 2022, at the Sonoma Raceway in Sonoma, California. It will be contested over 64 laps on the  road course. It will be the fifth race of the 2022 ARCA Menards Series West season.

Background

Entry list 

 (R) denotes rookie driver.
 (i) denotes driver who is ineligible for series driver points.

Practice/Qualifying

Starting Lineups

Race

Race results

References 

2022 in sports in California
General Tire 200
2022 ARCA Menards Series West